L'amore si muove ("Love Moves") is the fourth studio album by Italian operatic pop trio Il Volo. It was released internationally under the title Grande amore
The album is a mix of original songs and cover versions, in Italian, English and Spanish.
The album debuted at number 2 in Italy and reached the top spot on its second week. It was certified double platinum by Federazione Industria Musicale Italiana. Grande Amore peaked at number 1 on the Billboard Top Classical Albums and Billboard Latin Pop Albums, and at number 2 on the Billboard Top Latin Albums chart.

Reviews
Robyn Gallagher  of Wiwibloggs said; "'L'amore si muove/Grande Amore' shows Il Volo doing what they do best. The trio reliably deliver bold, passionate songs in Italian, English and Spanish, putting a modern spin on canzone classics as well as introducing new material."

Singles
The lead single was the title track "L'amore si muove" released on August 28. The video premiered on 4 September 2015.

The International and Spanish editions include the group's Eurovision Song Contest 2015 song, "Grande Amore".

Track listings

L'amore si muove

Grande Amore (International Edition)

Grande Amore

Charts

L'amore si muove

Grande amore - International Version

Grande amore

See also
 List of number-one hits of 2015 (Italy)
 List of number-one Billboard Latin Pop Albums from the 2010s

Certifications

References

External links

2015 albums
Il Volo albums